Tumelo is a South African given name that may refer to
Tumelo Bodibe (born 1987), South African cricketer
Tumelo Khutlang, South African football forward
Tumelo Nhlapo (born 1988), South African football defender
Tuks Senganga (born Tumelo Kepadisa in 1981), South African Motswako rapper
Tumelo Ramafoko(born 1994), South African, Writer and Pop Star
Tumelo Simelane (born 1995), South African cricketer
Tumelo Thagane (born 1984), South African triple jumper